Olaf Bodden (born 4 May 1968) is a German former professional footballer who played as a striker.

Career
Bodden was born in Kalkar, West Germany. He had to end his active career in 1997 after he got Infectious mononucleosis and then Chronic fatigue syndrome (CFS). With the TSV 1860 Munich he scored 25 goals in 67 matches and is presently the record goal scorer of Hansa Rostock in the 2. Bundesliga.

"Der müde Stürmer" is the title of a German documentary on Bodden's fight against the Chronic fatigue syndrome.

References

External links 
 Article and video "Ich hatte kein Immunsystem und keinen Lebensmut mehr" at build.de 
 

1968 births
Living people
People with chronic fatigue syndrome
Association football forwards
German footballers
Borussia Mönchengladbach players
Borussia Mönchengladbach II players
FC Hansa Rostock players
TSV 1860 Munich players
Bundesliga players
2. Bundesliga players